The Institute for Advanced Study, Tsinghua University (CASTU) is a research institute established in Beijing in 1997. Modelled after the Princeton-based Institute for Advanced Study, albeit in a university setting, it is engaged in theoretical studies in physics, computer science and biology. Its honorary director is the Nobel Laureate professor Chen Ning Yang, who has provided guidance and support to CASTU since its inception, and current director is professor Gu Binglin.

References

External links
 Home Page

Tsinghua University
Research institutes in China
Biological research institutes
Physics institutes